Natural Progression is a 2004 album by the Canadian hip hop group Sweatshop Union.  Natural Progression established Sweatshop Union as a player in the conscious underground rap scene.

Track listing
 "The Answer" – 2:39
 "Radio Edit" – 3:16
 "Newsflash" – 0:21
 "I Got News" – 4:03
 "Don't Be Afraid" – 3:59
 "Better Days" – 3:15
 "Today" – 3:33
 "US" – 3:04
 "Truman Show" – 3:06
 "Baho Ang Titi Mo" – 1:31
 "On the Sly" – 3:41
 "P.O.T.B." – 3:50
 "Garbage Love Songs & Cheesy Jingles" – 3:35
 "The Way" – 4:12
 "Stolen Memories" – 4:20
 "Any Reason" – 3:04
 "The Thing About It" – 4:24
 "The Question (Outro)" – 6:58

References

2004 albums
Sweatshop Union albums